Igra bojama (trans. Play with Colours) is the second studio album by Serbian and former Yugoslav rock band Oktobar 1864, released in 1988. The album was produced by Mitar Subotić.

Track listing

Personnel 
 Tanja Jovićević - vocals
 Goran Tomanović - guitar
 Dejan Abadić - keyboards
 Željko Mitrović - bass
 Ivan Zečević - drums
 Marko Lalić - saxophone
 Vuk Dinić - trombone
 Branko Baćović - trumpet

Guests
 Milan Mladenović - backing vocalist

External links

Oktobar 1864 albums
1988 albums
PGP-RTB albums
Serbian-language albums